Akçay is a village in the İnebolu District, Kastamonu Province, Turkey. Its population is 41 (2021).

References

Villages in İnebolu District